White Balloon Day is a symbol of support for survivors of child sexual abuse. It first began after a public meeting in Belgium in October 1996, when 300,000 people gathered with white balloons to show public sympathy and support for the parents of girls who were sexually assaulted of a previously convicted and then released paedophile. 

White Balloon Day is also held annually during National Child Protection Week in Australia. Its aim is to raise awareness of child sexual assault within the community. The 2018 date was September 7.

References

External links
 White Balloon Day Official Website

Awareness days
Child sexual abuse in Belgium
September observances
Child sexual abuse in Australia